Zakaria Beglarishvili (born 30 April 1990) is a Georgian-Estonian professional footballer who plays as an attacking midfielder and winger for FCI Levadia Tallinn.

International career
In November 2015, Beglarishvili was called up by Kakhaber Tskhadadze for the Georgia national football team against Estonia and Albania. On 11 November 2015, he made his debut in the match against Estonia, coming on from the bench in the 79th minute.

He expressed his desire to play for the national team of Estonia, country where he has played since 2009. In December 2018, after 8 years of living in Estonia, he passed the Estonian language exam and applied for the citizenship. He received an Estonian passport in September 2019. Eventually FIFA did not allow him to represent Estonia, due to not meeting the requirements.

Honours
Levadia Tallinn
Meistriliiga:2021
Estonian Supercup: 2022

Flora
Meistriliiga: 2010, 2011, 2015, 2017
Estonian Cup: 2011, 2013
Estonian Supercup: 2011, 2012, 2014

KTP
Ykkönen: Runner-Up 2020

References

External links
 
 
 

1990 births
Living people
Footballers from Tbilisi
Estonian footballers
Footballers from Georgia (country)
Expatriate footballers from Georgia (country)
Georgia (country) international footballers
Meistriliiga players
Esiliiga players
Veikkausliiga players
Ykkönen players
FC Flora players
Budapest Honvéd FC players
FC Tbilisi players
FC Dila Gori players
FC Lokomotivi Tbilisi players
FC Sioni Bolnisi players
Seinäjoen Jalkapallokerho players
Kotkan Työväen Palloilijat players
FCI Levadia Tallinn players
Association football midfielders
Expatriate footballers in the Netherlands
Expatriate footballers in Finland
Expatriate footballers in Hungary
Expatriate footballers in Estonia
Expatriate sportspeople from Georgia (country) in the Netherlands
Expatriate sportspeople from Georgia (country) in Finland
Expatriate sportspeople from Georgia (country) in Hungary
Expatriate sportspeople from Georgia (country) in Estonia
Estonian expatriate sportspeople in Finland
Naturalised citizens of Estonia